Falcon Rest, also known as the Clay Faulkner House, is a historic house in Warren County, Tennessee. It was built in 1896-1897 for Clay Faulkner, the son of politician and mill owner Asa Faulkner, who lived at Falconhurst.

Faulkner lived in the house with his wife, Mary King Saunders, and their five children. He was the owner of the Great Falls Cotton Mill. From 1929 to 1941, the house was owned by Dr. Herman Reynolds, who welcomed patients into his home. McMinnville Mayor W. V. Jones was the owner from 1943 to 1945. The house was later used as a hospital, until it was remodelled as a private residence by the Grissoms and the McGlothins in the 1980s.

The house was designed in the Queen Anne architectural style. It has been listed on the National Register of Historic Places since 1992.

Since 1993, the house functions as a bed-and-breakfast, and some people claim it is haunted.

References

External links
Falcon Rest Mansion & Gardens

Houses on the National Register of Historic Places in Tennessee
Queen Anne architecture in Tennessee
Houses completed in 1896
National Register of Historic Places in Warren County, Tennessee
Reportedly haunted locations in Tennessee
1896 establishments in Tennessee